The Uttam Nagar West  Metro Station is located on the Blue Line of the Delhi Metro.

The station

Station layout

Entry/Exit

Facilities
List of available ATM at Uttam Nagar West metro station are Oriental Bank of Commerce, Punjab National Bank.

Connections

Bus
Delhi Transport Corporation bus routes number 724EXT, 816A, 816EXT, 817, 817A, 817B, 818, 819, 822, 824, 824LnkSTL, 824SSTL, 824STL, 825, 826, 827, 828, 829, 832LinkSTL, 833, 834, 835, 836, 845, 872, 873, 876, 878, 883A, 887, 891STL, serves the station from outside metro station stop.

Gallery

See also

Delhi
List of Delhi Metro stations
Transport in Delhi
Delhi Metro Rail Corporation
Delhi Suburban Railway
Delhi Monorail
Delhi Transport Corporation
West Delhi
New Delhi
Dwarka, Delhi
National Capital Region (India)
List of rapid transit systems
List of metro systems

References

External links

 Delhi Metro Rail Corporation Ltd. (Official site) 
 Delhi Metro Annual Reports
 
 UrbanRail.Net – Descriptions of all metro systems in the world, each with a schematic map showing all stations.

Delhi Metro stations
Railway stations opened in 2005
Railway stations in West Delhi district